A copiotroph is an organism found in environments rich in nutrients, particularly carbon. They are the opposite to oligotrophs, which survive in much lower carbon concentrations.

Copiotrophic organisms tend to grow in high organic substrate conditions. For example, copiotrophic organisms grow in  Sewage lagoons. They grow in organic substrate conditions up to 100x higher than oligotrophs.

Classification and Identification 

The bacterial phyla can be differentiatied into copiotrophic or oligotrophic categories that correspond and structure the functions of soil bacterial communities.

Interaction with other organisms 

Copiotrophic relation between oligotrophic bacteria depends on the amount of concentration the soil has of C compounds. If the soil has large amounts of organic C, it would then favor the copiotrophic bacteria.

Ecology 

Copiotrophic bacteria are a key component in the soil C cycle. It is most important during the period of the year when vegetation is photosynthetically active and exudes large amounts of simple C compounds like sugar, amino acids, and organic acids. Copiotrophic bacteria are also found within marine life.

References 

Fierer, N., Bradford, M. A., & Jackson, R. B. (2007). Toward an ecological classification of soil bacteria. Ecology, 88(6), 1354-1364. 
Ivars-Martinez, E., Martin-Cuadrado, A. B., D'auria, G., Mira, A., Ferriera, S., Johnson, J., ... & Rodriguez-Valera, F. (2008). Comparative genomics of two ecotypes of the marine planktonic copiotroph Alteromonas macleodii suggests alternative lifestyles associated with different kinds of particulate organic matter. The ISME journal, 2(12), 1194-1212.
Lladó, S., & Baldrian, P. (2017). Community-level physiological profiling analyses show potential to identify the copiotrophic bacteria present in soil environments. PLoS One, 12(2), e0171638.

Organisms by adaptation
Trophic ecology